is a railway station on the Nippō Main Line operated by JR Kyushu in Usuki, Ōita, Japan.

Lines

Layout 
The station has a side platform and an island platform serving three tracks at grade. Two sidings run to the south of platform 3. The station building is a modern concrete structure which houses an enclosed waiting room, shop and a staffed ticket window. Access to the island platform is by means of a footbridge.

Management of the passenger facilities at the station has been outsourced to the JR Kyushu Tetsudou Eigyou Co., a wholly owned subsidiary of JR Kyushu specialising in station services. It staffs the ticket booth which is equipped with a Midori no Madoguchi facility.

Adjacent stations

History
The Kyushu Railway was nationalised on 1 July 1907. Japanese Government Railways (JGR), designated the track as the Hōshū Main Line on 12 October 1909 and expanded it southwards in phases, with Usuki opening as the new southern terminus on 15 August 1915. On 15 December 1923, the Hōshū Main Line was renamed the Nippō Main Line. With the privatization of Japanese National Railways (JNR), the successor of JGR, on 1 April 1987, the station came under the control of JR Kyushu.

On 17 September 2017, Typhoon Talim (Typhoon 18) damaged the Nippō Main Line at several locations. Rail services were restored on 18 December 2017. Of the two tracks there, only one would be restored. According to JR Kyushu, having only a single track there (effectively closing down the signal box) would not have a large impact on its timetables and believed that it amounted to a full restoration of service.

Passenger statistics
In fiscal 2016, the station was used by an average of 700 passengers daily (boarding passengers only), and it ranked 206th among the busiest stations of JR Kyushu.

Environs 
The station is near the center of the city, convenient to several sites. Among these are
Usuki Ferry Terminal
Administrative offices including the Usuki City Hall, police and fire stations, court, tax office
Usuki Park, location of the former Usuki Castle
Ōita Prefectural Usuki High School
Usuki Shipyard
The Nogami Yaeko Memorial Museum

See also
Usuki Station (Kagoshima)
List of railway stations in Japan

References
This article incorporates information translated from the article 臼杵駅 (Usuki-eki) in the Japanese Wikipedia, retrieved on October 25, 2008.

External links

Usuki (JR Kyushu)

Railway stations in Ōita Prefecture
Stations of Kyushu Railway Company
Railway stations in Japan opened in 1915